1947 Partition may refer to:

Partition Plan for Palestine, a United Nations resolution that recommended the creation of independent Arab and Jewish States within Mandatory Palestine.
Partition of India, the partition of the British Indian Empire that led to the creation of India and Pakistan.